John Norman Lawson (24 March 1897 – 14 August 1956) was an Australian politician. He was a member of the United Australia Party (UAP) and served in federal parliament from 1931 to 1940, representing the Division of Macquarie in New South Wales. He was Minister for Trade and Customs in the first Menzies Government from 1939 to 1940.

Early life
Born in Sydney to James Lawson and Eleanor, née Day, he was educated at Sydney Boys' High School, and the University of Sydney. He worked as a veterinarian in New Zealand from 1920 until 1926, when he bought Kidgery, a sheep station near Nyngan, New South Wales. He married Jessie Alicia Orchard, daughter of Richard Orchard, in 1925.

Politics
In 1930, Lawson unsuccessfully stood as a Nationalist candidate for the seat of Cobar in an attempt to enter the New South Wales Legislative Assembly. He was later endorsed by the United Australia Party to contest the federal seat of Macquarie, held by Ben Chifley, the Labor Minister for Defence. In a surprising result, Lawson defeated Chifley by 456 votes, having been helped by the split of the Labor vote between Chifley and the Lang Labor candidate, Tony Luchetti.

Lawson was a vocal supporter of the proposal to establish a shale-oil undertaking at Newnes, near Lithgow, and in 1934 he increased his margin in Macquarie substantially. He was part of the delegation to the coronation of King George V, and was assistant to the treasurer Richard Casey and then the minister for industry Robert Menzies. When Menzies resigned in protest at Prime Minister Joseph Lyons' refusal to proceed with a scheme for national insurance, the loyal Lawson resigned his portfolios too. Upon Lyons' death in 1939, Menzies, as the new Prime Minister, was able to reward Lawson's devotion by appointing him minister for trade and customs.

Lawson was an important part of the World War II effort in Australia, and was appointed to the Economic Cabinet in 1939. He also attracted criticism from the Country Party, which had withdrawn from its alliance with the UAP, for negotiating a deal which gave Australian Consolidated Industries Ltd a virtual monopoly over the Australian motorcar industry. He embarrassed the ministry when it was revealed that he had leased a racehorse, and was reprimanded, but not sacked, by Menzies. Lawson, convinced that he had jeopardised the government, resigned anyway, on 23 February 1940. At the 1940 federal elections, he lost his seat to Chifley.

Later life
Lawson retired to Arrowfield, a farm at Jerrys Plains, New South Wales, and died of myocardial infarction on 14 August 1956, survived by his wife, daughter and two sons. He was remembered by colleagues and opponents as an able and fair man.

References

United Australia Party members of the Parliament of Australia
Members of the Australian House of Representatives for Macquarie
Members of the Australian House of Representatives
1897 births
1956 deaths
Politicians from Sydney
20th-century Australian politicians
Australian veterinarians
Male veterinarians